Hugh McMahon (born 17 June 1938) is a former Scottish politician, who served in the European Parliament.

McMahon was educated at Jordanhill College and the University of Glasgow.  He became a head teacher, and also became active in the Labour Party, chairing the Socialist Education Association of Scotland from 1978 until 1982, and the Scottish Fabian Society from 1979 until 1984.  He also served on the executive of the Scottish Labour Party from 1980 until 1983.

At the 1984 European Parliament election, McMahon was elected for Strathclyde West.  He ceased to be an MEP when Euro-constituencies were re-organised in 1999.

External links
election results

References

1938 births
Living people
Alumni of the University of Glasgow
Scottish Labour MEPs
MEPs for Scotland 1994–1999